Kiti ( []) is a village in the Larnaca District of Cyprus, located 11 km southwest of Larnaca. It is noted for the Byzantine church Panagia tis Angeloktistis or Panagia Angeloktisti ("Panagia Built by Angels"). According to local tradition, the residents of ancient Kition (now Larnaca) moved to Kiti in order to escape the Arab invasions. They decided to build the church, but according to tradition, the foundation of church moved overnight. According to legend, an army of angels came overnight to build the church, which is where it gets its name.

Climate
The climate in this area is described by the Köppen Climate Classification System as  "dry-summer subtropical"  often referred to as "Mediterranean" and abbreviated as Csa.

References

Communities in Larnaca District